William Robinson (February 27, 1825 – September 15, 1895) was a member of the Wisconsin State Assembly.

Biography
Robinson was born on February 27, 1825, in Northwich, England. He settled in Moscow, Wisconsin. During the American Civil War, he was drafted into the Union Army, serving in the 22nd Wisconsin Infantry Regiment. He died in Hollandale, Wisconsin, on September 15, 1895.

Assembly career
Robinson was elected to the Assembly in 1872 and 1873. He was a Republican.

References

External links

People from Northwich
English emigrants to the United States
19th-century English politicians
People from Iowa County, Wisconsin
Republican Party members of the Wisconsin State Assembly
People of Wisconsin in the American Civil War
1825 births
1895 deaths
19th-century American politicians